Pākira Nunatak is a nunatak,  high, at the north end of Metcalf Spur on the plateau of the Willett Range of Victoria Land. Pākira is a Māori word meaning "bald head", and was applied descriptively to this nunatak in 2005 by the New Zealand Geographic Board.

References

Mountains of Victoria Land
Willett Range